The Cyprininae are one of at least 11 subfamilies of cyprinid fish. It contains three genera in its strictest definition but many more are included depending on which authority is defining it, especially if the Labeobarbinae is not considered to be a valid grouping.

Recognized genera

 Arabibarbus (3 species)
 Barboides (2 species)
 Barbonymus (tinfoil barbs) (10 species)
 Capoeta (35 species)
 Carassioides (4 species)
 Carassius (5 species)
 Cyprinus (24 extant and 1 fossil species)
 Eechathalakenda (Channa barb)
 Gymnocypris (10 species)
 Labeobarbus (126 species)
 Paraqianlabeo (1 species)

References 

Phylogeny of the subfamily cyprininae (Pisces: Cyprinidae), Z. Wei,  Acta Zootaxonomica Sinica, 1989
Cyprininae, XL Chen, HJ Huang, Monographs of Cyprinidae in China, Shanghai, 1982
Cyprininae, YL Luo, PQ Yue, Fauna Sinica. Osteichthyes: Cypriniformes III. Science, 2000

 
Fish subfamilies
Taxa named by Constantine Samuel Rafinesque